Gennady Nikolaevich Bachinsky (1 September 1971 – 12 January 2008) was a Russian radio talk show host and producer. He was also known as one of founders and guitarist of the indie group Chimera.

Bachinsky was born in Yarovoye in the Altai Krai, he originally trained as a systems engineer. He started his radio career in St. Petersburg where he co-hosted several popular shows with Sergei Stillavin in the 1990s. In 2001 Bachinsky moved to Moscow and along with Stillavin he co-hosted the top rated morning talk show "Two In One" on Radio MAXIMUM. Bachinsky and Stillavin were referred to as the "Howard Sterns of Russian Radio". They co-hosted the show for 5 years, in 2007 Bachinsky and Stillavin left to join the State radio broadcaster Mayak.  In 2007 they both won the Radiomania National Award for "Best Morning Show".

On 12 January 2008 Bachinsky was killed in a road traffic accident when he violated the traffic code by driving his Volkswagen Golf in the opposite lane. He collided with a Volkswagen Transporter, killing a woman inside and injuring two other people. The accident occurred in the Tver Oblast region. He was buried at the Troyekurovskoe cemetery in Moscow.

References

Bibliography 
 Бурлака А. Рок-энциклопедия. Популярная музыка в Ленинграде-Петербурге. 1965—2005. Том 3. — М.: Амфора, 2007. — С. 433—477.
 Гаккель В. Аквариум как способ ухода за теннисным кортом. С-Пб.: Амфора, 2007. — 416 с. — 

1971 births
2008 deaths
Burials in Troyekurovskoye Cemetery
People from Altai Krai
Road incident deaths in Russia
Russian radio personalities
Talk radio hosts
Lead guitarists
20th-century guitarists